Ingrid Timková (born January 17, 1967 in ČSSR) is a Slovak actress. She is most notable for appearing in the first Czech-Slovak film produced after the dissolution of Czechoslovakia, Anjel Milosrdenstva (1993), directed by Miloslav Luther. The role of Anežka brought Timková the Magnolia Award at the 5th Shanghai TV Festival in 1994 as Best Actress in a Television Film.

Biography
Timková was born in Sečovce, formerly Czechoslovak Socialist Republic, as the second descendant of then mother-teacher and father who was a device/traffic chief. She attended the Gymnasium (class of 85') in Trebišov, and continued with study of acting at the Slovak Academy of Performing Arts in Bratislava. As a protégée of director Vladimír Strnisko, she became a member of the Slovak National Theatre's ensemble after graduating in 1990. Along with playing on the stage, she developed her film career mainly on TV. She made her debut on television in Zázračná ihla (1988) by Ján Chlebík. In addition, she would take part in other over twenty TV plays, some of which included TV series. On the screen, Timková was cast occasionally; overall in five productions. Since the new millennium, the actress is more active in instructing students at the Faculty of Theatre of her former college. Once she also tried a theatre direction (with Sam Shepard's play Fool for Love, 2004) in Bratislava City Theatre. She has an older brother. Timková is single and chidlless.

Filmography

Television

A  A TV version of the movie consisted of two episodes.
B  The work was ranked by the US online database IMDb as the 47th Worst English-Language Film with the country of origin Czech Republic.
C  Denotes a TV series.
D  Denotes a televised theatre play.

Awards

Notes
E  Anjel Milosrdenstva was produced by Slovak Television in co-production with Czech Television and ARS Media. As such it was classified as a TV film. As a result of being also screened in the country of its origin, the title was accepted for the Czech Lion ceremony, which awards mainly feature length films.
F  Won Ivana Chýlková for her role of Olga in Díky za každé nové ráno (1994), directed by Milan Šteindler.
G  Won Klára Melíšková for her role of Zdena in Mistři (2004), directed by Marek Najbrt.

References

General

 

Specific

External links

1967 births
Living people
People from Sečovce
Slovak stage actresses
Slovak film actresses
20th-century Slovak actresses
21st-century Slovak actresses